Paratrogoderma mahense is a species of beetles in the family Dermestidae, the only species in the genus Paratrogoderma.

References

Dermestidae genera
Monotypic Bostrichiformia genera